The Parramatta Female Factory, is a National Heritage Listed place and has three original sandstone buildings and the sandstone gaol walls. The Parramatta Female Factory was designed by convict architect Francis Greenway in 1818 and the only female building authorized by Governor Lachlan Macquarie. It comprises the 1821 Matron's Quarters and Administration and Stores Building, the 1821 Female Hospital and the 1826 3rd Class Female Penitentiary. It is the first female factory in the penal colony of New South Wales, and is located at 5 Fleet Street, North Parramatta, New South Wales, Australia. It was one of 13 female factories in the colonies of New South Wales and Van Diemen's Land.  In New South Wales, female factories were also established in Bathurst, Newcastle, Port Macquarie and Moreton Bay (2 factories). The factory idea was a combination of the functions of the British bridewells, prisons and workhouses. The Parramatta Female Factory is being considered for World Heritage listing.

History
The first female factory was above the Parramatta Gaol, in what is now Prince Alfred Square (formerly known as Gaol Green and Hanging Green). This two storey building was commissioned by Governor King and the convict women moved in 1804. Within a decade there was considerable pressure on the authorities to deal with increasing numbers of female convicts who could not be adequately accommodated at the factory. There were over 200 women and children in a place that could only house 30 at night.

The factory was the destination for many of the convict women sent as prisoners to the colony of NSW. Over 9,000 names have been recorded as passing through the factories, of which an estimated 5,000 went through Parramatta.

With the arrival of Governor Lachlan Macquarie a solution was acted on. Macquarie selected a  portion of William Bligh's 105 acre grant further upstream on the Parramatta River to build a new factory and issued instructions to convict architect Francis Greenway to design a building that would accommodate 250 women. This was the first purpose built female factory in the Colony and a model for the others.

The first stone was laid by Governor Macquarie in 1818 and the women were transferred from the old factory in 1821. The factory was built using convict labour from locally quarried sandstone and was completed in 1821 at the cost of £4,778. It had an oak shingled roof, floors of  paving or stringbark with barred leadlight windows in the basement and lead glazed windows on the upper floors. The first floor was used for meals with the top two floors for sleeping and other activities. The porter, deputy superintendent, superintendent and matron were provided with separate accommodation on the site.

The Parramatta Female Factory was multi-purpose. It was a place of assignment, a hospital, a marriage bureau, a factory, an asylum and a prison for those who committed a crime in the Colony. The reason it is called a factory is because it manufactured cloth - linen, wool and linsey woolsey.  It was also the site of the colony's first manufactured export producing  of woven cloth in 1822.The women also did spinning, knitting, straw plaiting, washing, cleaning duties and if in third class, rock breaking and oakum picking.

In 1827, the factory was the site of Australia's first industrial action when women rioted as a response to a cut in rations and poor conditions.  By 1842 the factory accommodated 1,203 women as well as children. With the end of convict transportation to the colony, in 1848 the site was reassigned as a Convict Lunatic and Invalid Asylum.

Current use
The Parramatta Female Factory is now the earliest surviving female factory in Australia. The site is listed on the New South Wales State Heritage Register and is inscribed on the Australian National Heritage List on 17 November 2017.

In popular culture
 In 1937, Parramatta Female Factory was the subject of the film To New Shores directed by Douglas Sirk and starring Zarah Leander. 
 Joy Storey wrote a musical about the female factory in the 1960s. 
 Nick Enright wrote a play called the Female Factory in the 1980s.
 In 1981, Australian folk group Redgum released a track, "Parramatta Gaol 1843", with lyrics alluding to an escape attempt from the Parramatta Female Factory. 
In 2008 it was the subject of a play, a cartoon, an exhibition that travelled around Australia - Women Transported - Life in Australia's Convict Female Factories.
 In 2017, Tom Kenneally and Meg Kenneally published a crime fiction novel, The Unmourned, set in the Parramatta Female Factory.

See also

 Cascades Female Factory
 Parramatta Archaeological Site
 Parramatta Correctional Centre
Parramatta cloth
 Ross Female Factory

References

Further reading
 Gay Hendriksen, Carol Liston and Trudy Cowley, Women Transported — Life in Australia's Convict Female Factories, 2008, Parramatta, Parramatta Heritage Centre
 Gay Hendriksen, Conviction: The 1827 fight for rights at Parramatta Female Factory, Blaxland, The Rowan Tree, 2015

Archival holdings 

 NRS 12228 - Principal Superintendent of Convicts: Parramatta Female Factory, Record of females discharged, Oct 1846-Apr 1848 [6/5347 part], Reel 2802. Held New South Wales State Archives and Records.
 NRS 12229 - Female Factory, Parramatta: Medical case book, 1846-Mar 1848 [6/5350 part]. Held New South Wales State Archives and Records.

External links

The Female Factory Online
https://sites.google.com/site/convictfemalefactories/ 
 Parramatta Female Factory Precinct website
Parramatta Female Factory Action Group Inc website
Cascades Female Factory website
Early images of the Female Factory
Image of the Female penitentiary or factory, Parramatta, painted by Augustus Earle in 1826, from the National Archives of Australia.
 [CC-By-SA]
"Parramatta Female Factory - Building entity". Dictionary of Sydney. Dictionary of Sydney Trust. Retrieved 11 April 2021.

1796 establishments in Australia
History of New South Wales
Convictism in New South Wales
Defunct prisons in Sydney
1847 disestablishments
Buildings and structures in Parramatta
Walter Liberty Vernon buildings in Sydney
Women's prisons in Australia